Thelonious Sphere Monk: Dreaming of the Masters Series Vol. 2 is an album by the Art Ensemble of Chicago and Cecil Taylor released on the Japanese DIW label. It features performances by Lester Bowie, Joseph Jarman, 
Roscoe Mitchell, Malachi Favors Maghostut and Don Moye with Cecil Taylor guesting on piano, vocals and percussion.

Reception

The AllMusic review by Scott Yanow describes the album as "more significant historically than it is musically" due to a mismatch between Taylor's style and the Art Ensemble's.

Track listing
 "Dreaming of the Masters" (Jarman) - 0:57  
 "Intro to Fifteen" (Art Ensemble of Chicago, Taylor) - 18:25  
 "Excerpt from Fifteen Part 3A" (Art Ensemble of Chicago, Taylor) - 10:51  
 "'Round Midnight" (Monk) - 15:23  
 "Caseworks" (Art Ensemble of Chicago, Taylor) - 8:22  
 "Nutty" (Monk) - 7:27  
 "Dreaming of the Masters" (Jarman) - 0:52  
Recorded January 16–19 & 31, February 3 and March 10–11, 1990 at Systems Two Studios, Brooklyn, NY

Personnel
Lester Bowie: trumpet, flugelhorn
Malachi Favors Maghostut: bass, percussion
Joseph Jarman: saxophones, clarinets, percussion
Roscoe Mitchell: saxophones, clarinets, flute, percussion
Don Moye: percussion
Cecil Taylor: piano, vocals, percussion

References

1991 albums
DIW Records albums
Art Ensemble of Chicago albums
Thelonious Monk tribute albums